Ameles assoi is a species of praying mantis native to Morocco, Tunisia, and Spain.

References

assoi
Mantodea of Africa
Mantodea of Europe
Insects of North Africa
Insects described in 1873
Taxa named by Ignacio Bolívar